Dipankar  Dey  is an Indian actor in the Bengali film industry. He has worked in movies as a hero, villain and character artist.

He starred in Ray's Jana Aranya (The Middleman, 1976), Ganashatru (Enemy of the People, 1990), Shakha Proshakha (Branches of the Tree, 1990) and Agantuk (The Stranger, 1991). He has acted in many art house and commercial films.

Selected filmography

TV shows
{| class="wikitable"
|-
! Year
! Title
! Role
! Language
! Channel
|-
| 2000 - 2005
| Ek Akasher Niche
| 
| Bengali
| Zee Bangla
|-
| 2009
| Asambhab
|
| Bengali
| Zee Bangla
|-
| 2016-2017
| Jarowar Jhumko
| Pannalal Roy
| Bengali
| Zee Bangla
|-
| 2017-2018
| Bhojo Gobindo
| Pratap Narayan Chaudhury
| Bengali
| Star Jalsha
|-
| 2018
| Jai Kanhaiya Lal Ki
| Janki Prasad Chaudhury
| Hindi
| Star Bharat
|-
| 2019–Present
| Kanak Kakon
| Samyamoy Lahiri
| Bengali
| Colors Bangla|-
| 2010-2011
| Gaaner Oparey| Chandrasekhar Deb
| Bengali
| Star Jalsha
|-
| 2020–Present
| Jibon Saathi| Mollinath Banerjee
| Bengali
| Zee Bangla
|-
| 2021–Present
| Sarbojaya| Bogola
| Bengali
| Zee Bangla
|-
| 2021–Present
| Khukumoni Home Delivery| Ashutosh Deb
| Bengali
| Star Jalsha
|}

Awards
1986 National Film Awards: Best Supporting Actor: Parama''

References

External links

Living people
University of Calcutta alumni
Bengali male actors
Male actors in Bengali cinema
Best Supporting Actor National Film Award winners
Indian male film actors
1944 births
Male actors from Jharkhand